Paraburkholderia heleia is a gram-negative, nitrogen-fixing, aerobic, non-spore-forming, rod-shaped bacterium from the genus Paraburkholderia and the family Burkholderiaceae which was isolated from the Chinese water chestnut Eleocharis dulcis in acid sulfate soil areas of Vietnam. Colonies of Burkholderia heleia are pale yellow.

References

heleia
Bacteria described in 2010